This is a list of vice presidents of the United States by place of primary affiliation. Some vice presidents have been born in one state, but are commonly associated with another. New York was the birth state of eight vice presidents, the most of any state: George Clinton, Daniel D. Tompkins, Martin Van Buren, Millard Fillmore, Schuyler Colfax, William A. Wheeler, Theodore Roosevelt, and James S. Sherman. New York was also the home state of an additional four vice presidents—Aaron Burr, Chester A. Arthur, Levi P. Morton, and Nelson Rockefeller.

States of primary affiliation 

Note:  The flags presented for the states are the present day flags, which were not necessarily adopted in the times of the earliest vice presidents.

Vice presidents by state of primary affiliation
A list of U.S. vice presidents grouped by primary state of residence and birth, with priority given to residence. Only 22 out of the 50 states are represented. Vice presidents with an asterisk (*) did not primarily reside in their respective birth states (they were not born in the state listed below).

Birth dates and birthplaces of U.S. vice presidents

Notes

See also 
 List of presidents of the United States by home state

United States, Vice Presidents
home state